Rhetoric is the art of effective or persuasive speech. Stance is an individual's attitudes in emotional and intellectual matters, or a philosophical position in a logical argument. Rhetorical stance is the position of a speaker or writer in relation to audience, topic, and situational context. A rhetorical stance is an effective argument in favor of a particular position in order to persuade others to agree.

Purpose
The utilization of rhetorical stance can help to better the argument presented. The persona, audience, and context of a rhetorical piece are all interrelated, and when properly arranged, make a persuasive rhetorical stance. According to James L. Golden, Goodwin Berquist, and William Coleman, authors and speakers can use only the arguments and communication skills available to them to convey their purpose. Aristotle argued that the arguments available for any given topic are specific to that particular rhetorical situation. Lloyd Blitzer contended that the availability of arguments depends on the relationships between author, audience, context, and purpose. For example, some communicators may decide to include or exclude certain points from their argument or will adjust their tone to which address a particular audience.

Author or speaker 
Wayne Booth described rhetoric as "the art of persuasion." According to Booth, an effective author or speaker of rhetorical stance balances three essential elements within their rhetoric: speaker, argument, and audience. A speaker accomplishes this balance by using proper voice that implies character, as well as explicitly stating all pertinent arguments about the subject matter, and by taking into account the audience's distinct characteristics and personality traits. Booth argued that a speaker who ignores the relationship between them and their audience—and whose argument is based solely on the information they are producing about their subject—"will produce the kind of essay that soils our scholarly journals, written not for readers but for bibliographies."

Context 
Authors position themselves in relation to their audience based on the relevant contextual elements that affect the communicative situation. Brian Street argued for a broad definition of "context" to include "conceptual systems, political structures, economic processes, and so on, rather than simply a 'network' or 'interaction.'" Stephen Levinson has a narrower definition, which limits relevant contextual elements to immediate and observable events. Some examples of worldly "context" that could influence an author or speaker are: current affairs or politics, natural disasters, religious or social standards, or war.

The rhetorical triangle and tetrahedron 

Aristotle established the classic triad of ethos, pathos and logos (the Aristotelian triad of appeals) that serves as the foundation of the rhetorical triangle.  The rhetorical triangle evolved from its original, sophistic model into what rhetorician Sharon Crowley describes as the "postmodern" rhetorical triangle, the rhetorical tetrahedron. The expanded rhetorical triangle now emphasizes context by integrating situational elements.

The original version includes only three points: the writer/speaker (ethos), the audience (pathos), and the message itself (logos). All the points affect one another, so mastering each creates a persuasive rhetorical stance.

The rhetorical tetrahedron carries those three points along with context. Context can help explain the "why" and "how" something is written by introducing the setting in which it was created.

Audience
According to Aristotle and twentieth-century rhetoricians, experienced speakers begin their process of adopting rhetorical stance with an analysis of the audience. Professional authors and speakers use their knowledge of the subject and establish credibility to help influence how well their message is received. Rhetorician George Campbell explained how one can gain power over and appeal to their audience by applying argumentative and emotional tones. Aristotle emphasized the consideration of human nature and emotion in order to achieve a successful understanding of one’s audience and the establishment of the relationship necessary for achieving persuasion. According to Kenneth Burke, the author creates this impression by demonstrating an understanding of the audience’s needs and by "substantiating" intellectual and empathetic relationships between oneself and the audience. Following Aristotle's theory, Roman Senator Cicero explained that by adapting to the emotions of the audience, one can be successful in gaining their respect and attention.

In academic communities
In academia, several courses offered at institutions incorporate rhetorical stance. Speech and English departments, especially, have implemented this tactic in their educational plans. In speech classes, rhetorical stance is used when the speaker, the student presenting, is addressing the audience, their classmates. According to Ross Winterowd, speakers and authors adjust their rhetorical stance to accommodate a particular audience. When the speaker is talking, they alter their rhetorical stance and use various techniques for different audiences based on the particular situation. There are several ways that a speaker or writer can make their audience feel a connection or relation to them. Speakers use anchorage and relay to appeal to their audience. Anchorage uses images to assist the speaker get specific points across, while relay uses moving images, such as videos, comic strips, etc. to do the same. A particular pronoun can make the audience feel either included or excluded. If the author says, for example, "All of us Europeans are well traveled," it implies that all of "us" Europeans agree with the fact that "we" are well traveled. However, if a non-European is in the audience, they will not feel a connection to the speaker or author, making them feel very antagonistic.

In non-academic communities 
A speaker takes a rhetorical stance in all communications, not only public address, formal argument, or academic essays. Although one finds the bulk of the discussion on rhetorical stance in academia, a myriad of "other-than-academic communities," such as business, law and politics, journalism and media, and religious institutions utilize and discuss theories of rhetorical stance.

References 

Rhetorical techniques